Saint Sava College was one of the earliest academic institutions in Wallachia, Romania. It was the predecessor to both Saint Sava National College and the University of Bucharest.

History
It was the continuator of the Princely Academy from Bucharest, and was initially located in the buildings of Saint Sava Monastery, nowadays the site of the University of Bucharest. Its origines are connected to the lectures delivered in Romanian by Gheorghe Lazăr in the Princely Academy, beginning with 1818. After the Hetairia movement from 1821, the Ottoman Sultan forbade the existence of Greek schools, but he allowed the existence of Romanian schools. Thus, by the efforts of Lazăr and of other professors that associated with him, like Eufrosin Poteca, Ion Heliade Rădulescu, Vasile Ardelean, a.k.a. Laszlo Erdely, or Petrache Poenaru, the Saint Sava Academy managed to hold the same academic level as the former Greek-language Princely Academy. The Academy was split in 1864 on orders from Domnitor Alexandru Ioan Cuza, the purely academic branch being converted into the University of Bucharest, while the secondary education one was organized as the current Saint Sava National College.

See also
Princely Academy of Bucharest

Sources
 

Educational institutions established in 1821
Educational institutions disestablished in 1864
History of Bucharest
Education in Bucharest
History of Wallachia (1821–1859)
1821 establishments in Romania